Polkowski is a Polish surname. Notable people with the surname include:

Andrzej Polkowski (1939–2019), Polish translator
Grzegorz Polkowski (born 1983), Polish Paralympic swimmer

Polish-language surnames